Douglas Education Center (DEC) is a private, for-profit, higher education career school located thirty miles south of Pittsburgh, Pennsylvania.

History
Warren Douglas founded the Douglas Business College in 1904 as a business and secretary school. In 1977, it became the Douglas School of Business. In 2001, it became the Douglas Education Center.

Admissions
Douglas Education Center grants admissions to individuals who have successfully earned a high school diploma or a GED high school equivalency. Douglas Education Center accepts applications year round.

Academics
Douglas Education Center offers specialized business degrees, diplomas and certificates in various fields. Below is a breakdown of the programs offered.  In addition to programs in the health sciences, cosmetology, and skilled trades, the center offers the following specialized programs:

Creative Programs
Tom Savini's Special Make-Up Effects Program: Formed in 2000, Tom Savini's Special Make-Up Effects Program is a sixteen-month Associate in Specialized Business Degree Program. Special effects artist Tom Savini developed this program.
George A. Romero's Filmmaking Program: Founded in 2008 under the name The Factory Digital Filmmaking Program at Douglas, George A. Romero's Filmmaking Program is a sixteen-month Associate in Specialized Business Degree Program. The program is a hands-on, modern approach to learning the art of filmmaking. Facilities include a soundstage with green screen, infinity wall, rooms for make-up, wardrobe and props, editing suites, a sound mixing studio, and a 50+ seat theater for film classes and collaborating among other programs at DEC. Students learn techniques from industry professionals including Robert Tinnell, a motion picture screenwriter, director, and producer as well as the director of the program.

Accreditation
Accreditation is evidence that an institution maintains an approved course of study, that it employs a competent faculty of instructors, that it has adequate facilities and equipment, that it is supported by an enrollment of students sufficient to give assurance of stability and permanency, and that it enjoys a reputation of ethical and honorable dealings with the public.

Douglas Education Center is accredited by the Accrediting Council for Independent Colleges and Schools (ACICS) and is approved to award Associate in Specialized Business Degrees and Diplomas.

The Accrediting Council for Independent Colleges and Schools is listed as a nationally recognized accrediting agency by the United States Department of Education. Its accreditation of degree-granting institutions is recognized by the Council for Higher Education Association.

References

External links

Education in Pennsylvania
Educational institutions established in 1904